Konstantin Vitalyevich Kryukov (born 7 February 1985) is a Russian actor. He is known for playing the role of Dzhokonda in The 9th Company.

Konstantin Kryukov was born on 7 February 1985 in Moscow in the family of the actress Yelena Bondarchuk and doctor of philosophy Vitaly Kryukov. He is the grandson of legendary Soviet director and actor Sergei Bondarchuk and actress Irina Skobtseva, nephew of Fyodor and Natalya Bondarchuk.

Filmography
 2005 The 9th Company as Private Ruslan Petrovskyy (Dzhokonda)
 2006 Heat as Kostya
 2006 Love as love as Michael Prorva
 2006 Three polugratsii as Pavel Arsenevich Gushchin, an aspiring writer
 2007 Kilometer Zero as Arthur
 2009 Soldiers (TV series) as Andrey Landyshev
 2010 Odnoklass as Fedya  
 2011 On hook! as Alexander Vlasov
 2012 Happy New Year, Mom! as Yaroslav
 2013 What are men doing! as Yarik
 2013 Sex Competition as Yaroslav
 2013 Studio 17 (TV series) as Maksim (1 episode)
 2013 While still alive as Roma
 2014 Champions as Anton Sikharulidze
 2014 Spiral as Stas

References

External links

 

1985 births
Living people
Russian male film actors
Russian male television actors
Male actors from Moscow
21st-century Russian male actors
Bondarchuk family
Kutafin Moscow State Law University alumni